John West III (1666–1734) was a justice and sheriff of King and Queen County and a House of Burgesses representative for King William County, all in the Colony of Virginia.  He was the eldest son of Colonel John West, and grandson of John West (governor).

Biography
John West inherited the West Point plantation established by his grandfather.  In 1692, he was appointed justice in King and Queen County and also as a sheriff of the county. He represented the newly formed County of King William in the House of Burgesses from 1702 to 1706 and was also a justice of the peace.

Marriage and issue
On October 15, 1698, in Elizabeth City County, he married Judith Armistead, the daughter of Captain Anthony Armistead.  The issue of the marriage was at least a son, Charles, who inherited the West Point estate and a daughter Susanna, who married
William Ingram Pace. 
Charles West served in the 3rd Virginia Regiment with the rank of major from February 1, 1777 to July 6, 1778.  May 29, 1780, Charles was in the Waxhaw Massacre, and later vouched that John King lost both arms in that battle.  Dying unmarried and without issue, he bequeathed 'West Point' to his mother, and after her death to his first cousin Thomas West (son of his father's brother Thomas) "and the heirs male of his body lawfully begotten, for ever..."  The entail was broken in November 1761, when a trust was established to enable 1000 acres of the land to be sold in order to purchase slaves.

Ancestry

1676 births
1734 deaths
Virginia colonial people
Virginia sheriffs
John West III
People from West Point, Virginia